This is a list of settlements in Suffolk by population based on the results of the 2011 census. The next United Kingdom census will take place in 2021. In 2011, there were 18 built-up area subdivisions with 5,000 or more inhabitants in Suffolk, shown in the table below.

This not a list of parishes or their populations, but of settlements as defined by the ONS.

Population ranking

References

External links
 Link to ONS built up area statistics

Suffolk-related lists
Suffolk, Settlements
Suffolk, Settlements